Barnabe Creek is a stream in the U.S. state of California. It is located in Marin County.

References

Rivers of Northern California
Rivers of Marin County, California